General elections were held in Japan on 27 December 1969. The result was a victory for the Liberal Democratic Party, which won 288 of the 486 seats. Voter turnout was 68.51%, the lowest since 1947. This was the first general election in Japanese history in which candidates were allowed limited use of television as a means for campaigning, something that had been formerly proscribed under Japan's strict election campaign laws.

The main national policy issue at the time was the possibility of reverting Okinawa, which had been under American military occupation since the end of World War II, back over to Japanese control. Nonetheless, as is characteristic of Japanese elections, voters were more interested in pocket book issues, or "livelihood problems" (kurashi mondai), over pressing national and foreign policy questions. The election was marked by relative apathy, especially among young people in urban areas, with voter turnout in Tokyo being the lowest in the country, dropping from 63.12% in the last election to 56.35% in the 1969 election.

Moreover, old districting laws from the pre-war period were still in effect, and as urban areas increased in population, individual rural voters (who were heavily skewed towards the LDP) were disproportionately more powerful than the average individual urban voter. In any event, the actual popular vote of the LDP had been continuously sliding down since its formation, and the LDP's increase in seats was more attributable to its competent endorsement of only a limited number of local seat candidates when compared to the Japan Socialist Party, which ran too many candidates and thus split votes at a disastrous rate. Ironically, what little increase in support the JSP saw was found primarily in rural areas rather than urban areas, the latter of which were traditionally seen as the base of the JSP's support; the young Kōmeitō and reformed Japanese Communist Party had been gradually making inroads into urban areas, further eating away at the JSP's strength.

Results
Ichirō Ozawa won a seat in the House of Representatives for the first time, becoming the youngest elected legislator at the time. He went on to become a powerful political figure in the LDP and other parties.

Future prime minister Tsutomu Hata was drafted to run in the election following his father's death, and won a seat for the first time. Future prime minister Junichiro Koizumi also attempted to win his late father's seat in the election, but lost.

By prefecture

References 

Japan
1969 elections in Japan
General elections in Japan
December 1969 events in Asia
Election and referendum articles with incomplete results